A ute, originally an abbreviation for "utility" or "coupé utility", is a term used in Australia and New Zealand to describe vehicles with a tonneau behind the passenger compartment, that can be driven with a regular driver's license.

Traditionally, the term referred to vehicles built on passenger car chassis and with the cargo tray integrated with the passenger body (coupé utility vehicles). However, present-day usage of the term "ute" in Australia and New Zealand has expanded to include any vehicle with an open cargo area at the rear, which would be called a pickup truck in other countries.

Etymology
Historically, the term "ute" (short for 'utility vehicle') has been used to describe a 2-door vehicle based on a passenger car chassis, such as the Holden Commodore, Australian Ford Falcon, Chevrolet El Camino and Subaru BRAT. Australian-produced utes were traditionally rear-wheel drive and with the cargo tray integrated with the passenger body (as opposed to a pickup truck, where the cargo tray is separated from the passenger body).

In the 21st century, the term has become more broadly used, for any vehicle with a cargo tray at the rear (which would be called a pickup truck in other countries).

History

The concept of a two-door vehicle based on a passenger car chassis with a tray at the rear began in the United States in the 1920s with the roadster utility (also called "roadster pickup" or "light delivery") models. These vehicles were soft-top convertibles, compared with the fixed steel roof used by most utes.

Ford Australia was the first company to produce an Australian Coupe ute, which was released in 1934. This was the result of a 1932 letter from the unnamed wife of a farmer in Australia asking for "a vehicle to go to church in on a Sunday and which can carry our pigs to market on Mondays". In response, Ford designer Lew Bandt designed a two-door body with a tray at the rear for the American Ford Model A chassis, and the model was named "coupe utility". When the Australian version was displayed in the US, Henry Ford nicknamed it the "Kangaroo Chaser". A convertible version, known as the roadster utility was produced in limited numbers by Ford in the 1930s.

In 1951, Holden released a "utility" model, which was based on the 48–215 sedan. With both Ford and Holden now producing utes, this started the long-standing tradition of Australian-designed 2 door vehicles with a tray at the back, based on a passenger-car sedan chassis.

Cultural impact

Australia has developed a culture around utes, particularly in rural areas with events known as ute musters. It is common, particularly in rural areas, to customise utes in the "B&S style" with bullbars, spotlights, oversized mudflaps, exhaust pipe flaps and UHF aerials. Since 1998, the "Deni Ute Muster" has been held in the town of Deniliquin, which has become a major attraction for the area.

High performance utes were also sold in Australia, including the FPV F6 and the HSV Maloo. The 2017 HSV GTSR Maloo is powered by a  supercharged V8 engine producing .

The Australian V8 Utes is a racing series based on lightly modified production Holden and Ford utes.

Australian models

Ford

The ute variant of the Ford Falcon was produced from 1961-2016. For the first 38 years of production, the design used a coupe ute style, but with the introduction of the 1999 AU Falcon, the Falcon ute switched to a cargo bed that is separate from the cabin, while still retaining the Falcon sedan front-end and cabin. The cargo bed was separated so that both "utility" and "cab chassis" body styles could be produced together.

Utes produced by Ford in Australia:
 1941–1949 1941 Ford
 1949–1951 1949 Ford
 1946–1953 Ford Anglia Coupe Utility
 1956–1962 Ford Consul Mk.II 
 1961–2016 Ford Falcon Ute
 1952–1959 Ford Mainline Utility
 1953–1955 Ford Popular 103E
 1946–1953 Ford Prefect
 1956–1962 Ford Zephyr Mark II Coupe Utility

In addition, the Ford Ranger (T6) was designed by Ford Australia, but built elsewhere. It was the second best selling new car in Australia in 2019 and 2020.

Holden

From 1951–1968, the "utility" was sold as part of the 48–215 to HR model ranges. From 1968–1984 the "utility" was included in the Holden Belmont/Kingswood range. In 1984, Holden discontinued the ute variant and it was not part of the VB to VL Commodore ranges. The model returned in 1990 based on the VN Commodore chassis and remained part of the model range until Australian production ended in 2017. In 2000, the Holden Commodore was the first Australian ute to feature independent rear suspension, the Ford Falcon ute retained a live axle rear suspension design until production ended in 2016.

In 2008, the VE Commodore Ute was proposed to be exported to North America as the Pontiac G8 ST. At least one prototype was built, but GM decided not to proceed with production due to the Global Financial Crisis.

Utes produced by Holden or its parent company General Motors in Australia:
 1946–1948 Chevrolet Stylemaster
 1951–1957 Vauxhall Velox
 1951–1968 Holden Utility
 1952–1954 Vauxhall Wyvern
 1968–1984 Holden Kingswood
 1990–1991 Holden Utility (VG)
 1991–2017 Holden Ute / Holden Commodore Ute (VP to VF)

Holden also sells rebadged utes produced elsewhere. They include:
 1980–2008 Holden Rodeo, rebadged Isuzu Faster and Isuzu D-Max.
 2008–2020 Holden Colorado, rebadged Chevrolet Colorado built in Thailand.

Chrysler

Models:
 1953-1957 Plymouth Belvedere
 1956–1957 Plymouth Cranbrook
 1956-1958 Plymouth Savoy
 1956–1957 Dodge Kingsway
 1956–1957 DeSoto Diplomat
 1958–1961 Chrysler Wayfarer 
 1965–1979 Chrysler Valiant Utility and Dodge Utility

British Leyland
Models:
 1954–1974 Austin Cambridge Coupe Utility
 1968–1971 Austin 1800 Utility

Hillman
Models:
 1950-1958 Commer Light Pick-up, based on the Hillman Minx
 1956 Hillman de luxe Utility

Asian models

Isuzu 

Isuzu sells the Isuzu D-Max in Australia. Previously, this vehicle was sold rebadged as the Holden Rodeo.

Mazda 

Mazda has sold the Mazda BT-50 in Australia since 2006.

Mitsubishi

Mitsubishi has sold the Mitsubishi Triton in Australia since 1978. In 2019, it was the fifth best selling new car in Australia.

Nissan
Between 1971-2008 Nissan sold the Nissan Sunny Truck as a ute in Australia. Since 1985, Nissan has sold the Nissan Navara pickup style ute in Australia.

Proton
Between 2002-2010, the Proton Jumbuck was sold in Australia as a ute.

Subaru

Subaru produced the Subaru Brumby, a small AWD model derived from the second generation Leone. It was sold between 1978–1993 and known as the BRAT, Shifter, MV, and Targa in countries other than Australia. It is relatively well known due to its long production life and use in popular culture. It was built in Japan, but never sold there.

Suzuki 
From 1983 to 1988, Suzuki built a ute version of their Alto kei car called the Mighty Boy. It was sold in Japan, Australia, and Cyprus.

Toyota

Between 1960 and 1970, Toyota sold a ute variant of the second- and third-generation Corona with an integral bed. It was sold alongside its eventual replacement, the Toyota Hilux, for a couple of years before it was discontinued. Toyota also sold a locally produced CKD ute based on the second- and third-generation Crown (also known as S40 and S50), assembled by Australian Motor Industries.

Toyota currently sells a ute variant of the Toyota Land Cruiser (J70). In 2011, the Toyota Hilux was Australia's highest selling ute.

European models

Mercedes-Benz 
Between 2017 and 2020, the Mercedes-Benz X-Class was sold in Australia. It used the chassis of the Nissan Navara.

Volkswagen 
Volkswagen has sold the Volkswagen Amarok, a pickup style ute since 2010.

See also

 Camper shell
 Car classification
 Flatbed truck
 Kei truck
 Panel van
 Pickup truck
 Roadster Utility
 Coupe Utility
 Self-driving truck

References

Bibliography
 
 
 

Coupé utilities
Pickup trucks